Seán Ryan (1939 - 1 March 2012) was an Irish Gaelic footballer. His league and championship career with the Offaly senior team spanned nine seasons from 1959 to 1966.

Ryan made his senior debut for Offaly during the 1958-59 league. Over the course of the next nine seasons he won two Leinster medals. Ryan played his last game for Offaly in November 1966.

Honours

Offaly
Leinster Senior Football Championship (2): 1960, 1961

References

1939 births
2012 deaths
Doon Gaelic footballers
Offaly inter-county Gaelic footballers
St Monica's (Offaly) Gaelic footballers